Warwick is an unincorporated community in Cecil County, Maryland, United States. Warwick is located along Maryland Route 282 east of Cecilton and just west of the Delaware border. St. Francis Xavier Church was listed on the National Register of Historic Places in 1975.

Notable person
Al Burris, baseball player

References

Unincorporated communities in Cecil County, Maryland
Unincorporated communities in Maryland